Black Glacier is a broad tributary to the Lillie Glacier flowing northeast, marking the southeast extent of the Bowers Mountains, a major mountain range situated in the geographical location of Victoria Land, Antarctica. The glacier was first mapped by the United States Geological Survey from ground surveys and from U.S. Navy air photos, 1960–62, and named by the Advisory Committee on Antarctic Names for Robert F. Black, former geologist of the University of Wisconsin, project leader for Antarctic patterned ground studies, who carried out research in the McMurdo Sound region during several summer seasons in the 1960s. The glacier lies situated on the Pennell Coast, a portion of Antarctica lying between Cape Williams and Cape Adare.

References
 

Glaciers of Pennell Coast